Fraser's Magazine for Town and Country was a general and literary journal published in London from 1830 to 1882, which initially took a strong Tory line in politics. It was founded by Hugh Fraser and William Maginn in 1830 and loosely directed by Maginn (and later Francis Mahony) under the name Oliver Yorke, until about 1840. It circulated until 1882, when it was renamed Longman's Magazine.

Editors
In its early years, the publisher James Fraser (no relation to Hugh) played a role in soliciting contributors and preparing the magazine for the press. After James Fraser's death in 1841 the magazine was acquired by George William Nickisson, and in 1847 by John William Parker. In 1863, Thomas and William Longman took over all of Parker's business. Its last notable editor was James Anthony Froude (1860–1874). In 1882, Fraser's Magazine was renamed Longman's Magazine, and was popularised and reduced in cost to sixpence.

Contributors

Among the contributors were Thomas Carlyle, William Makepeace Thackeray, Thomas Medwin, James Hogg, William Mudford, Janet Ross and John Stuart Mill. The 1835 group portrait by Maclise misleads in that David Brewster, Samuel Taylor Coleridge, John Gibson Lockhart and Robert Southey, while included, were not substantial contributors. Others who were active at that period were Percival Banks, T. C. Croker, John Galt, John Abraham Heraud, E. V. Kenealy, David Macbeth Moir, Francis Mahony, Robert Willmott and Thomas Wright. Another contributor was William Jardine Smith.

References

Further reading
Fisher, Judith Law, 'In the Present Famine of Anything Substantial": Fraser's "Portraits" and the Construction of Literary Celebrity; or, "Personality, Personality Is the Appetite of the Age"', Victorian Periodicals Review 39:2, Summer 2006, pp. 97–135
Thrall, Miriam. Rebellious Fraser's: Nol Yorke's Magazine in the Days of Maginn, Carlyle and Thackeray. New York: Columbia University Press, 1934.

External links

 Freely available issues at Internet Archive
All issues at UPenn's Online Books Page
Freely available issues at Google Books: Vol.2, Aug.1830-Jan.1831, Vol.8, July-December 1833
Notes on Fraser's Magazine
From Vol.7, October 1832, translation of Goethe's Das Märchen (The tale), with Introduction by "O.Y." (William Maginn)
William Maginn biography

1830 establishments in England
1882 disestablishments in England
Visual arts magazines published in the United Kingdom
Defunct magazines published in the United Kingdom
Magazines published in London
Magazines established in 1830
Magazines disestablished in 1882